Higinio Carrocera Mortera (January 1908 – 8 May 1938) was an Asturian anarcho-syndicalist who participated in the Revolution of 1934 and fought during the Spanish Civil War in Asturias.

Biography

Youth 
The son of a working-class couple, during his childhood he helped his family with agricultural tasks while attending the village primary school. A metalworker by profession, began working for the company Duro Felguera and at an early age he joined the CNT, the majority union among the metallurgists of La Felguera.

He actively participated in the Revolution of 1934, in which he directed a column that arrived from La Felguera in Oviedo on 6 October. With the defeat of the Revolution, he was able to escape, but was arrested in Zaragoza on 7 August 1935, together with Constantino Antuña Huerta and taken to the Oviedo Prison. After the victory of the Popular Front in the 1936 Spanish general election, he participated in a prisoner mutiny that obtained their freedom on 20 February, one day before the amnesty was promulgated.

Role during the Civil War 
At the beginning of the Spanish Civil War, on 17 July, he participated in the capture of the Civil Guard barracks in La Felguera. Two days later he marched at the head of 400 anarcho-syndicalists towards Gijón, where he had a prominent role in the Siege of Gijón, participating in the taking of Simancas barracks and El Coto. After the capture of the headquarters of the "Simancas" regiment, a massacre took place, which Carrocera tried to prevent without success. Later he directed the military operations during the Siege of Oviedo and in September 1936, he was wounded in the Villafría sector, during the fight against the nationalists. Confirmed as a militia major, he became one of the main commanders of the confederal militias in Asturias. The anarcho-syndicalist author Diego Abad de Santillán described him as an "authentic hero".

Carrocera, a supporter of the militarization of the militias, came to command a battalion and took part in various military operations. In September 1937 he commanded the 192nd Mixed Brigade. At the head of this unit he fought in the Battle of El Mazuco, managing to defend a gorge against nationalist units. Thanks to this, the advance of the nationalist forces was be halted for several days. At the proposal of Francisco Ciutat de Miguel, he was awarded the Medal of Freedom for his performance.

Capture and Execution 
After Asturias fell into the hands of the Spanish Army, he was arrested and taken to a concentration camp in Galicia. Carrocera had refused to be evacuated by sea along with other Republican commanders. Upon being recognized, he was taken back to Asturias, where he was again confined to the Oviedo prison. The following month, on 21 February, Higinio Carrocera Mortera appeared before a council of war and was sentenced to death. He was executed by firing squad on 8 May 1938.

Notes

References

Sources
 
 
 
 
 
 

People from Asturias
Spanish anarchists
1908 births
1938 deaths
People from Langreo
Spanish military personnel of the Spanish Civil War (Republican faction)
People executed by Spain by firing squad